The Rejmes Ladies Open was a women's professional golf tournament on the Swedish Golf Tour, played between 2002 and 2012. It was always held near Norrköping, Sweden.

Tournament sponsor was initially , a local Volvo dealer. Lotta Wahlin from nearby Linköping won the tournament two successive years.

In 2008, as part of the tour's major overhaul in conjunction with the introduction of the SAS Masters Tour, the tournament doubled its purse and was renamed the VW Söderbergs Ladies Masters, after the new sponsor Söderbergs, a local Volkswagen dealer.

Notably, future LPGA Tour players Anna Nordqvist, Daniela Holmqvist and Camilla Lennarth all  secured victories in the tournament as amateurs.

Winners

References

Swedish Golf Tour (women) events
Golf tournaments in Sweden